Day of Deliverance may refer to:

 Day of Deliverance (India), the 1939 celebration of Indian National Congress resignations by political rivals
 Pioneer Day (Utah), a holiday archaically known as the "Day of Deliverance"